Disney Princess: Magical Jewels is a video game in the Disney Princess franchise that was developed by 1st Playable Productions and released by Disney Interactive Studios for Nintendo DS in 2007. It is designed as a 2D puzzle action-adventure and features the six original Disney Princesses: Aurora, Belle, Cinderella, and Snow White are in the main game, while Jasmine and Ariel are playable in minigames.

Plot
An evil Queen has seized the Magical Jewels of the Kingdom of Kindness and destroyed the Golden Castle. To restore peace, Aurora, Belle, Cinderella, and Snow White team up to reclaim the Magical Jewels, defeat the Queen's minions and banish her from the kingdom for good.

Reception
Lucas M. Thomas of IGN gave the game a score of 6.5/10, calling it a "title that does a good job of visually presenting its worlds and characters and offering a lot of ground to cover, but gaining its multiple hours of gameplay primarily through repetition of the same core concept, again and again, with little variation along the way".

References

External links
Disney Princess: Magical Jewels at MobyGames

2007 video games
Action-adventure games
Disney Princess
Disney video games
Multiplayer and single-player video games
Nintendo DS games
Nintendo DS-only games
Puzzle video games
Video games developed in the United States
Video games featuring female protagonists
1st Playable Productions games